Trump tapes may refer to:

 Donald Trump Access Hollywood tape, recorded discussion between Donald Trump and Billy Bush in 2005
 Trump pee tape, an allegation from the 2016 Steele Dossier
 The Trump Tapes, 2022 audiobook release of interviews between Donald Trump and journalist Bob Woodward